Michael Gene Lee (born June 17, 1987) is an American professional boxer. He turned pro in February 2010.

Background
Lee is a 2005 graduate of Benet Academy in Lisle, Illinois where he was all conference linebacker in the Catholic League. Lee spent his freshman year at the University of Missouri and then transferred to the University of Notre Dame in 2006 and graduated with a 3.8 GPA in 2009 with a degree in finance from Notre Dame's Mendoza College of Business.  He was offered jobs on Wall Street. Lee says, "I relax by watching CNBC, and I like to read the Wall Street Journal."

Amateur career

Lee was introduced to the sport at age 16, when his cousin, who is an amateur boxer, took him to the Windy City Gym.

Notre Dame does not have an intercollegiate boxing team. However, Lee won the Bengal Bouts, an all campus intramural boxing tournament each of the three years that he attended the school.

During Lee's sophomore year, he won the 175-pound crown in a technical knockout that was called in the third round. In his junior year he was named junior captain and defended his title. Lee was named Boxer of the Year in his junior year, a feat that is typically reserved for a senior. Lee was named boxing team captain his senior year where he again won his third straight title in the Bengal Bouts.

Lee competed in the 2009 Chicago Golden Gloves competition in the sub-novice class, where Lee went undefeated in four matches, winning his class. In one memorable bout, Lee broke his opponents ribs thus immediately stopping the fight.

Professional career
Lee is the current IBF-USBA Light Heavyweight champion and is ranked in the top 15 of the light heavyweight world rankings. He trains with Jamal Abdullah at the famed Wild Card West Boxing Gym in Santa Monica, California. Prior to being in Los Angeles full-time, Lee was in Houston working with legendary trainer Ronnie Shields.

Lee won his professional debut on May 29, 2010 at the UIC Pavilion in Chicago, in a four-round unanimous decision over Emmett Woods. All three judges scored the fight 40-36. On September 11, 2010, at the Palms Resort and Casino in Las Vegas, Lee defeated Alex Rivera at 2:59 of the second round. Lee received national attention through his endorsement contract with Subway that resulted in his appearance in a 2013 Super Bowl television commercial.

Following Lee's knockout of Tyler Seever in August 2012, Lee did not fight again until 2014. Lee spent two years in and out of hospitals battling what was later learned to be an autoimmune disease known as Ankylosing Spondylitis. His comeback from the hospital bed to back in the ring was documented in his well received article he wrote for The Player's Tribune titled: Invisible Pain.

Lee won his return to the ring - a sixth-round TKO against Peter Lewison

On September 30, 2016 Lee won a ten-round unanimous decision over Chris Traietti (21-4) at Chicago's UIC Forum to win the USBA-IBF title. The scores were 98-91, 99-90, 99-90. The victory made Lee the first fighter from Notre Dame’s amateur boxing program to win a title in the pro ranks."

On 15th September, 2017, Mike Lee made easy work of Aaron Quattrocchi, defeating him in just one round. Lee dropped his opponent twice in the opening round, and hurt him badly enough that the referee had to stop the fight.

In his next fight, Lee defeated Jose Hernandez via 10-round unanimous decision. It seemed like it would be an early finish after Lee shook Hernandez significantly in the opening round. However, Hernandez recovered and made for an entertaining bout, which Lee still managed to win comfortably in the end.

In his following fight, Lee fought his first world title fight, against IBF super middleweight champion Caleb Plant. Plant dominated the fight from the beginning. His dominance culminated with two knockdowns in the third round, which prompted the referee to stop the fight and award the champion with the TKO win.

Professional boxing record

Charity work
In the summer of 2008 Lee went to Bangladesh to see first hand how the money raised during the Bengal Bouts is used to aid people of all different ages including the construction of an entire school for children.   Lee has established a foundation to help fund the Holy Cross Missions of Bangladesh where a portion of his purse money will be donated. In partnership with Champions for Children, he donated two ringside seats plus travel expenses for his November 2010 fight. The charity benefits Children’s Memorial Hospital.

On September 16, 2011, Lee headlined a professional boxing event at The University of Notre Dame inside the Purcell Pavilion in the Joyce Center.

The Mike Lee Foundation pledged all profits from this event, over $100,000 to the Ara Parseghian Medical Research Foundation, the Robinson Community Learning Center in South Bend and the Kelly Cares Foundation, headed by Coach Brian Kelly of the Fighting Irish Football Team.

References

External links

 Official Website
 Top Rank Bio

1987 births
Living people
People from Downers Grove, Illinois
Sportspeople from DuPage County, Illinois
Boxers from Illinois
American male boxers
University of Missouri alumni
University of Notre Dame alumni
Super-middleweight boxers